Trax Colton (born Louis A. Morelli; May 26, 1929) is an American former motion picture actor who appeared in two films as a contract player for 20th Century Fox between 1960 and 1962.

Life and career
Colton was born on May 26, 1929 in Highland Park, New Jersey, to Catherine De Angelis and Angelo Morelli, both of Italy. He had a sister, Martha Morelli. He was working as a used car salesman when he was discovered by Henry Willson, a Hollywood talent agent who had discovered Rock Hudson, Tab Hunter, Clint Walker, and Rory Calhoun, who changed his name to Trax Colton.

Colton signed an exclusive contract with 20th Century Fox in 1960 and was given a small part in the film adaptation of The Marriage-Go-Round (1961), starring Susan Hayward and James Mason. Soon thereafter, he was given a lead role in It Happened in Athens, a comedy plotting the adventures surrounding a winner at the first modern Olympic games in 1896. He played Spiridon Loues, a Greek shepherd who enters the Olympics as a runner. It co-starred sex symbol Jayne Mansfield, whom Colton had a brief affair with during filming. After the picture wrapped, Hollywood columnist Mike Connolly said in a 1961 column that Colton was Fox Studios' new "combination Rudolph Valentino–Ty Power".  In March 1961 Dorothy Kilgallen wrote that "his only other screen credit to date was a tiny role in Marriage-Go-Round but the female reaction around the nation was enough to give him a bigger chance" and speculated that Colton "may be our next matinee idol".

In November 1961, he screen tested for a film entitled Celebration for the part of a man who convinces Joanne Woodward to perform in a pornographic film. Celebration had been the film's working title, it was eventually produced in 1963 as The Stripper with Robert Webber in the role.

It Happened in Athens was released in 1962, but by that time, Colton had been released from his studio contract and stopped making movies.

Filmography

References

External links

Trax Colton at the New York Times

1929 births
Living people
American male film actors
People from Highland Park, New Jersey
Male actors from New Jersey